The 2020 Joe McDonagh Cup was the third staging of the Joe McDonagh Cup since its establishment by the Gaelic Athletic Association in 2018.  The competition was initially scheduled to begin on 10 May 2020 and end on 29 June 2020. Due to the impact of the COVID-19 pandemic on Gaelic games, the first-round games were delayed until 25 October 2020.

Laois, the 2019 champions, were promoted to the Leinster Senior Hurling Championship, while Offaly were relegated to the Christy Ring Cup. Meath and Carlow entered the cup.

On 13 December 2020, Antrim won the Joe McDonagh Cup after a 0–22 to 1–17 win over Kerry in the final at Croke Park. It was their first ever title.

Team changes

To Championship 
Relegated from the All-Ireland Senior Hurling Championship

 Carlow

Promoted from the Christy Ring Cup

 Meath

From Championship 
Promoted to the All-Ireland Senior Hurling Championship

 Laois

Relegated to the Christy Ring Cup

 Offaly

Teams and venues

Five teams compete in the 2020 Joe McDonagh Cup.

Competition format

Joe McDonagh Cup

Initially each of the five teams play the other four teams in a round of single round-robin matches. The top two teams qualify for the Joe McDonagh Cup final which is held at Croke Park.

All-Ireland Senior Hurling Championship

Normally the top two teams also enter the All-Ireland Senior Hurling Championship where they play the third-placed teams in the Leinster and Munster championships in the two All-Ireland preliminary quarter finals with the Joe McDonagh Cup teams having home advantage. The senior hurling championship was shortened in 2020 due to the COVID-19 pandemic, resulting in the cancellation of the participation of the two Joe McDonagh Cup finalists.

Promotion to Leinster or Munster SHC

The winner of the Joe McDonagh Cup can also be promoted to the following year's Leinster or Munster Senior Hurling championships, which form the first round of the All-Ireland Senior Hurling Championship. How this is achieved depends on the province to which the Cup champions belong.

If the Joe McDonagh champions are a non-Munster team, they are automatically promoted to the following year's Leinster Championship and the bottom-placed team in the Leinster Senior Hurling Championship are automatically relegated to the following year's Joe McDonagh Cup. If the champions are a Munster team (effectively, Kerry), they must win a play-off with the bottom-placed team in the Munster Championship to gain promotion at that teams expense to the following year's Munster Championship.

Relegation

The bottom-placed team in the Joe McDonagh Cup are usually relegated to the following year's Christy Ring Cup, and replaced by the 2020 Christy Ring Cup Champions. In 2021 the Leinster Senior Hurling Championship will be increased from five to six teams, meaning there will be no team relegated from the Joe McDonagh Cup in 2020. The 2020 Christy Ring Cup winners will be promoted to Maintain the Joe McDonagh Cup as a five team competition.

Group stage

Table

Round 1

Round 2

Round 3

Round 4

Round 5

Final

Statistics

Top scorers

Overall

In a single game

Miscellaneous 

 Antrim and Kerry both qualified to the Joe McDonagh Cup final for the first time.
 Antrim won their 1st championship in 3 years since winning the 2017 Ulster Senior Hurling Championship.

Awards
In February 2021, the GAA named the 2020 Joe McDonagh Team of the Year. Conor McCann of Antrim was named as the 2020 Joe McDonagh Cup player of the year.

 1:  Brian Tracey (Carlow)
 2:  Tomás O’Connor (Kerry)
 3:  Matthew Donnelly (Antrim)
 4:  Stephen Rooney (Antrim)
 5:  Jason Diggins (Kerry)
 6:  Aonghus Clarke (Westmeath)
 7:  Ger Walsh (Antrim)
 8:  Shane Nolan (Kerry)
 9:  Keelan Molloy (Antrim)
 10:  Niall McKenna (Antrim)
 11:  Shane Conway (Kerry)
 12:  Daniel Collins (Kerry)
 13:  Chris Nolan (Carlow)
 14:  Conor McCann (Antrim)
 15:  Ciaran Clarke (Antrim)

References

Joe McDonagh Cup
Joe McDonagh Cup
Joe McDonagh Cup